is a Japanese video game artist from Yokohama active since 1999, most known for her work with Arc System Works's Guilty Gear series.

Career
Initially joining the company as a part-time artist, she went on to work as general director on 4 titles, one of the few women in the Japanese game industry to hold such a position. The last of those, Battle Fantasia, came from an original concept by Iwasaki herself and was the developer's first fighting game with 3D models. With no previous experience, she and her team developed 2.5D techniques that influenced Street Fighter IV, as well as other Arc System Works games.

In 2011, she left Arc System Works and relocated to Singapore, holding leading positions in mobile game developers Gumi.

Although she found Arc System Works' CEO and the Guilty Gear team welcoming, Iwasaki also faced gender discrimination during her work with the company, which made her interested in working on other countries. She's been vocal about the hurdles women face in the Japanese video game industry, sharing her experience in United Nations events and working as an ambassador for the Singapore Committee for UN Women programme Girls2Pioneers.

References

External links
 
 Emiko Iwasaki on Twitter

1976 births
Living people
Japanese illustrators
People from Yokohama
Video game artists